Alberto Asor Rosa (23 September 1933 – 21 December 2022) was an Italian literary critic, historian, and politician. He was an Italian Communist Party (PCI) member of the Chamber of Deputies from 1979 to 1980. He died on 21 December 2022, at the age of 89.

References 

1933 births
2022 deaths
Italian historians
Italian Communist Party politicians
Deputies of Legislature VII of Italy
Sapienza University of Rome alumni
Academic staff of the Sapienza University of Rome
Academic staff of the University of Cagliari
Politicians from Rome